Crazy Otto may refer to:

Johnny Maddox (1927–2018), American pop musician
Fritz Schulz-Reichel (1912–1990), German pop musician
The Crazy Otto Medley, ragtime medley originally by Schulz-Reichel later recorded by Maddox

See also 
Ms. Pac-Man, a 1982 video game called Crazy Otto during development